The 2018 Korea Open (also known as the 2018 KEB Hana Bank Korea Open for sponsorship purposes) was a women's  professional tennis tournament played on hard courts. It was the 15th edition of the tournament, and part of the 2018 WTA Tour. It took place in Seoul, South Korea between 17 and 23 September 2018.

Points and prize money

Point distribution

Prize money

* per team

Singles main-draw entrants

Seeds 

 1 Rankings are as of September 10, 2018

Other entrants 
The following players received wildcards into the singles main draw:
  Choi Ji-hee
  Jang Su-jeong
  Park So-hyun

The following player received entry using a protected ranking into the singles main draw:
  Margarita Gasparyan
  Bethanie Mattek-Sands
  Mandy Minella

The following players received entry from the qualifying draw:
  Mona Barthel
  Varvara Flink
  Han Na-lae
  Priscilla Hon
  Dejana Radanović 
  Jil Teichmann

Withdrawals 
  Sorana Cîrstea → replaced by  Luksika Kumkhum
  Ekaterina Makarova → replaced by  Bethanie Mattek-Sands
  Tatjana Maria → replaced by  Dalila Jakupović

Doubles main-draw entrants

Seeds 

1 Rankings are as of September 10, 2018

Other entrants 
The following pairs received wildcards into the doubles main draw:
  Choi Ji-hee /  Han Na-lae 
  Jang Su-jeong /  Kim Na-ri

Champions

Singles 

  Kiki Bertens def.  Ajla Tomljanović 7–6(7–2), 4–6, 6–2

Doubles 

  Choi Ji-hee /  Han Na-lae def.  Hsieh Shu-ying /  Hsieh Su-wei 6–3, 6–2

References

External links 
 

Korea Open
Korea Open
2010s in Seoul
 
Korea Open (tennis)
Korea Open